James Cerretani and Adil Shamasdin were the defending champions but decided not to participate.
Pierre-Hugues Herbert and Maxime Teixeira won the title, defeating Dustin Brown and Jonathan Marray 7–6(7–5), 6–4 in the final.

Seeds

Draw

Draw

References
 Main Draw

Open BNP Paribas Banque de Bretagne - Doubles
2012 Doubles